In Freudian psychoanalysis, the ego ideal is the inner image of oneself as one wants to become. Alternatively, "the Freudian notion of a perfect or ideal self housed in the superego," consisting of "the individual's conscious and unconscious images of what he would like to be, patterned after certain people whom ... he regards as ideal."

In the French strand of Freudian psychology, the ego ideal (or ideal ego) has been defined as "an image of the perfect self towards which the ego should aspire."

Freud and superego

In Freud's "On Narcissism: an Introduction" [1914], among other innovations — "most important of all perhaps — it introduces the concepts of the 'ego ideal' and of the self-observing agency related to it, which were the basis of what was ultimately to be described as the 'super-ego' in The Ego and the Id (1923b)." Freud considered that the ego ideal was the heir to the narcissism of childhood: "This ideal ego is now the target of the self-love which was enjoyed in childhood by the actual ego. ... What he [man] projects before him as his ideal is the substitute for the lost narcissism of his childhood in which he was his own ideal."

The decade that followed would see the concept playing an ever more important and fruitful part in his thinking. In "Mourning and Melancholia" [1917], Freud stressed how "one part of the ego sets itself over against the other, judges it critically, and, as it were, takes it as its object." A few years later, in Group Psychology and the Analysis of the Ego (1921), he examined further how "some such agency develops in our ego which may cut itself off from the rest of the ego and come into conflict with it. We have called it the 'ego ideal'... heir to the original narcissism in which the childish ego enjoyed self-sufficiency." Freud reiterated how "in many forms of love-choice ... the object serves as a substitute for some unattained ego ideal of our own," and further suggested that in group formation "the group ideal ... governs the ego in the place of the ego ideal."

With "The Ego and the Id" [1923], however, Freud's nomenclature began to change. He still emphasised the importance of "the existence of a grade in the ego, a differentiation in the ego, which may be called the 'ego ideal' or 'super-ego'," but it was the latter term which now came to the forefront of his thinking. "Indeed, after The Ego and the Id and the two or three shorter works immediately following it, the 'ego ideal' disappears almost completely as a technical term" for Freud. When it briefly reappears in the "New Introductory Lectures"[1933], it was as part of "this super-ego ... the vehicle of the ego ideal by which the ego measures itself ... precipitate of the old picture of the parents, the expression of admiration for the perfection which the child then attributed to them."

Stekel's ego-ideal

Ernest Jones records that "I once asked Freud if he regarded an 'ego-ideal' as a universal attribute, and he replied with a puzzled expression: 'Do you think Stekel has an ego-ideal?'."

Further developments

Freud's followers would continue to exploit the potential tension between the concepts of superego and ego ideal. "Hermann Nunberg defined the ideal ego as the combination of the ego and the id. This agency is the outcome of omnipotent narcissism and is manifested as pathology." Otto Fenichel, building on Sandor Rado's "differentiation of the 'good' (i.e., protecting) and the 'bad' (i.e., punishing) aspects of the superego" explored attempts to "distinguish ego ideals, the patterns of what one would like to be, from the superego, which is characterized as a threatening, prohibiting, and punishing power": while acknowledging the linkages between the two agencies, he suggested for example that "in humor the overcathected superego is the friendly and protective ego-ideal; in depression, it is the negative, hostile, punishing conscience."

In narcissism

Kleinians like Herbert Rosenfeld "re-invoked Freud's earlier emphasis on the importance of the ego ideal in narcissism, and conceived of a characteristic internal object—a chimerical montage or monster, one might say—that was constructed of the ego, the ego ideal, and the 'mad omnipotent self'." In their wake, Otto Kernberg highlighted the destructive qualities of the "infantile, grandiose ego ideal" - of "identification with an overidealized self- and object-representation, with the primitive form of ego-ideal."

Harold Bloom has since explored in a literary context how "in the narcissist, the ego-ideal becomes inflated and destructive, because it is filled with images of 'perfection and omnipotence'." Escape from such "intense, excessive, and sometimes fatal devotion to the ego-ideal"—"to the narcissist, the only reality is the ego-ideal"—is only possible when one "gives up his corrupt ego-ideal and affirms the innocence of humility."

Ideal ego

The ideal ego is a concept that has been particularly exploited in French psychoanalysis. Whereas Freud "seemed to use the terms indiscriminately ... ideal ego or ego ideal," in the thirties 'Hermann Nunberg, following Freud, had introduced a split into this concept, making the Ideal-Ich genetically prior to the surmoi (superego). Thereafter Daniel Lagache developed the distinction, asserting with particular reference to adolescence that "the adolescent identifies him- or herself anew with the ideal ego and strives by this means to separate from the superego and the ego ideal."

Lacan for his part explored the concept in terms of the subject's "narcissistic identification ... his ideal ego, that point at which he desires to gratify himself in himself." For Lacan, "the subject has to regulate the completion of what comes as ... ideal ego — which is not the ego ideal — that is to say, to constitute himself in his imaginary reality."

"Janine Chasseguet-Smirgel (1985) identified various possible outcomes for the ego ideal, perverse as well as creative."

See also

References

Further reading
 M. L. Nelson ed., The Narcissistic Condition (New York 1977)
 

Ego psychology
Freudian psychology
Personality
Narcissism